D v D [2001] 1 FLR 495 was a Court of Appeal case determining the criteria necessary in disputes regarding residence in the United Kingdom. The father was granted shared residence. It was held amongst other things that costs will not normally be ordered in a contact and residence case unless the non-resident parent has behaved extraordinarily unreasonably. It is perfectly normal and proper for an NRP to seek that the children should seek to spend time with their father.

A more recent shared residence case concerning parental hostility is A Father and a Mother v Their Two Children (B and C) (2004) EWHC 142 FAM.

References
 http://www.familieslink.co.uk/pages/law_ukcases_dvd.htm

English family case law
Court of Appeal (England and Wales) cases
2001 in case law
2001 in England
Divorce law in the United Kingdom
2001 in British law